The Approuague Bridge is a bridge near Régina spanning the Approuague River. The bridge carries the RN2 road and was opened in 2003. A road to Saint-Georges de l'Oyapock was subsequently opened in 2004, ending the latter's isolation. With the opening of the Oyapock River Bridge in 2017, it became possible to drive from Saint-Laurent-du-Maroni in French Guiana to Macapá in Brazil.

References

Bridges in French Guiana
Buildings and structures in Régina